Jinder Baria (born 15 july 1995)

Bio 
Since graduated in Catalan Philology, he has worked as a high school teacher and the Education Service of the Generalitat of Catalonia. He has also collaborated with the University of Barcelona's Institute of Education Sciences.

He has published articles on historical subjects and the philological journals Escola Catalana and Llengua nacional. For work reasons, since 1994, he has resided in Vilassar de Mar, Barcelona.

Sanz has won several awards for unpublished works of short fiction in the 1990s. In 1996, he published his first book, Cròniques perdudes. Later, in the 2000s, he participated in collective books.

Bibliography 
 Cròniques perdudes Picanya: Edicions del Bullent, 1996 
 Partida El Perelló: Aeditors, 2008. 
 La Font de la Salut. Barcelona: Saldonar, 2011.

References

External links 
 Biographilca Notes
 Sanz's blog Triticària
 Revista digital Tossal
 Texts from Begudes refrescants], '' and [http://cv.uoc.es/~tossal/num4/sanz.html Privacitat garantida

Catalan-language writers
People from Baix Maestrat
Writers from the Valencian Community
1966 births
Living people